Andrew "Bubba" Pollard (born March 16, 1987) is an American stock car racing driver. He currently competes in super late model racing, driving the No. 26 Ford for his own team, and part-time in the ARCA Menards Series East, driving the No. 17 Ford for DGR-Crosley. He is noted as one of the most successful active super late model drivers, winning the All American 400, Rattler 250, World Crown 300 and the 2014 Southern Super Series championship.

Racing career

Growing up, Pollard raced at Senoia Speedway in Senoia, Georgia, a track that his grandfather owned. He was invited on Roush Racing: Driver X in 2005 but did not win the contest, and besides for sporadic ARCA Re/Max Series starts, did not have the funding to compete on a national level.

During the 2010s, Pollard won the 2014 Southern Super Series championship, and also ran several premiere late model events, winning the Kern County Raceway Park Winter Showdown in 2015 and 2016. 

During the 2017 Snowball Derby, Noah Gragson nicknamed Pollard "Redneck Jesus" for his popularity in the short-track racing community and his success. Pollard later said that he does not aspire to move up to NASCAR but rather stay in the grassroots feel of the short track community.

On August 3, 2019, Pollard and Matt Craig battled for the win in a CARS Tour race at Hickory Speedway. Craig won the race, and upon parking his car on pit road after the race, Pollard was offered a hand gesture by Craig's father. Pollard got out of his car and fought Craig's father before local law enforcement separated the two; Pollard was later fined his $1,500 race winnings and was suspended for the next five CARS Tour events. In September 2019, Pollard won his second consecutive Canadian Short Track Nationals at Jukasa Motor Speedway, winning $75,000 CAD ($56,000 USD). In October 2019, Pollard ran for JR Motorsports in the ValleyStar Credit Union 300. The partnership bloomed from Pollard developing a friendship with JRM late model driver Josh Berry during the 2019 CARS Tour season.

To start off 2020, Pollard ran a tour-type Modified for NASCAR Cup Series driver Ryan Preece at the World Series of Asphalt at New Smyrna Speedway. 

It was announced on March 9, 2020, that Pollard would make his debut in the ARCA Menards Series East, driving DGR-Crosley's No. 17 Ford in the race at Five Flags. The race was postponed due to the COVID-19 pandemic, but Pollard continued racing his super late model through the summer, scoring a Southern Super Series win at Five Flags. Pollard ventured to Jennerstown Speedway in Pennsylvania, winning a CARS/CRA co-sanctioned race. He also traveled to Wisconsin International Raceway for the ARCA Midwest Tour's Dixieland 250 and won his debut race at Citrus County Speedway.

Personal life
Outside of his racing career, Pollard is a construction worker. Pollard also has a wife and 2 children.

Motorsports career results

NASCAR
(key) (Bold – Pole position awarded by qualifying time. Italics – Pole position earned by points standings or practice time. * – Most laps led.)

ARCA Racing Series
(key) (Bold – Pole position awarded by qualifying time. Italics – Pole position earned by points standings or practice time. * – Most laps led.)

Superstar Racing Experience
(key) * – Most laps led. 1 – Heat 1 winner. 2 – Heat 2 winner.

References

External links
 

Living people
1987 births
ARCA Menards Series drivers
Racing drivers from Georgia (U.S. state)
ARCA Midwest Tour drivers